The Ministry of Defense (MD;) is the government department of East Timor accountable for the defence of the country and related matters.

Functions
The Ministry is responsible for the design, implementation, coordination and evaluation of policy for the areas of national defense and military cooperation.

Minister
The incumbent Minister of Defense is Filomeno da Paixão de Jesus.

See also 
 Politics of East Timor

References

External links

  – official site 

Defense
East Timor
East Timor, Defense
1975 establishments in East Timor